Old Mosque is mosque in Mersin, Turkey.

Location

History
In the 19th century Mersin was a small town and most of the coastline of the town belonged to the vakıf (foundation) of Bezmialem Sultan, mother of sultan Abdülmecit. In the 1860s the new sultan Abdülaziz decided to build a mosque and a fountain in the vakıf area. The fountain (with the water supply) was constructed in 1865 and the mosque in 1870. Originally these were named after the vakıf holder Bezmialem Sultan, the step mother of Abdülaziz. It is now the oldest mosque of Mersin which is still in use and it is properly called Old Mosque.

Technical details
The old mosque is a single minaret mosque. Although commissioned by the sultan its dimensions are not comparable to those in İstanbul. It has a wooden gable roof instead of a traditional dome. The mihrab is in a niche.

The mosque has been repaired in 1901, 1943 and 2008. The fountain, unlike most other mosques, is not in the yard: It faces Uray street to the south of the mosque.

References

Old Mosque
Mersin
Ottoman mosques in Mersin
Mosques completed in 1870
19th-century religious buildings and structures in Turkey